The Douglas County News was a weekly newspaper serving Douglas County, Oregon, United States, including the cities of Roseburg, Sutherlin, Winston, and Reedsport.

Originally established in 2002 as the North County News, the name was changed to the Douglas County News when the paper was purchased by publisher Becky Holm in 2008.  With this transition, the paper went county-wide from a more geocentric circulation.

The paper's headquarters are in Sutherlin.

References

External links 
Douglas County News (official website)

Douglas County, Oregon
Newspapers published in Oregon
Oregon Newspaper Publishers Association

Newspapers established in 2002
2002 establishments in Oregon